Letitia "Tish" Naghise (1963/1964 – March 8, 2023) was an American politician of the Democratic Party. She was the member of the Georgia House of Representatives for District 68 from January 2023 until her death that March.

Background and education 
Tish Naghise was born in Atlanta, and was of Nigerian descent. She earned an associate degree from Atlanta Metropolitan State College in 2006, a bachelor's degree in 2010 and a graduate degree from Clayton State University in 2022, respectively.

Career
A resident of Fayetteville, Georgia, Naghise was a local team leader for Barack Obama's 2008 and 2012 presidential campaigns, a field organizer for the Democratic Party of Georgia's coordinated campaign in 2016, and a field organizer for Jon Ossoff's campaign in the 2017 Georgia's 6th congressional district special election. She was named as a delegate for Georgia to the 2020 Democratic National Convention. Prior to her election, Naghise was an engagement organizer for Georgia Conservation Voters. She had also worked as a paralegal and co-owned a trucking company.

Personal life and death
Naghise and her husband, Charles, had two sons, one of whom predeceased her. She died at Piedmont Hospital in Atlanta on March 8, 2023, at the age of 59.

References 

1960s births
2023 deaths
21st-century African-American politicians
21st-century African-American women
21st-century American women politicians
American politicians of Nigerian descent
Clayton State University alumni
Democratic Party members of the Georgia House of Representatives
Paralegals
People from Fayetteville, Georgia
Women state legislators in Georgia (U.S. state)